Tang Rud Zizi (also Romanized as Tang Rūd Zīzī; also known as Tang Rūd) is a village in Ludab Rural District, Ludab District, Boyer-Ahmad County, Kohgiluyeh and Boyer-Ahmad Province, Iran. At the 2006 census, its population was 81, in 14 families.

References 

Populated places in Boyer-Ahmad County